Agia Paraskevi, also known as Aghia Paraskevi on signage, is a station on Athens Metro Line 3.

Station layout

Importance To Local Community
Aghia Paraskevi metro station is located in the border in-between Municipalities Of Aghia Paraskevi and Chalandri in North Athens district. It has 2 entrances, and a roof built and a magnificent building. It serves 7,000 passengers daily and is the 19th most used station in Line 3. It serves Aghias Paraskevis Avenue as well as many shops, residences, and the American Community School of Athens

References

Athens Metro stations
Agia Paraskevi
Transport in North Athens
Buildings and structures in North Athens
Railway stations opened in 2010